The 1998 Supercoppa Italiana was a match contested by Juventus, the 1997–98 Serie A winner, and Lazio, the 1997–98 Coppa Italia winner. 
It was the fourth appearance for Juventus (victories in 1995 and 1997), whereas it was Lazio's first appearance, and first victory.

Match details

References

1998
Supercoppa 1998
Supercoppa 1998
Supercoppa Italiana